Various Positions is a 2002 film directed by Ori Kowarsky and starring Carly Pope and Tygh Runyan.  Various Positions won the 2002 Prix de Montréal at the Montreal World Film Festival.  Although the film takes its title from an album by (and Ira Nadel's biography of) Leonard Cohen, the subject of the film is not Cohen, nor does he have any affiliation with the work.

Synopsis
In this briskly-paced romantic drama, college student Josh is on track for law school and a place at his father's firm. As his Orthodox Jewish family prepares for their traditional Passover celebrations, Josh hits a brick wall in the form of the alluring and troubled - and not quite Jewish - Cheryth.

As things heat up at the dorm and at home, Josh is suddenly questioning his faith, his father and his future. Even worse, Josh is caught in the middle as his father moves to cover up a scandal involving the Jewish cemetery, forcing Josh to take a stand for what he believes is right.

Passion and new love collide with family values and the demands of tradition as Josh, Cheryth, and Josh's family find themselves questioning their lives. Love and loyalty look a lot different when examined from various positions. In the end, Josh follows a road of his own choosing and it leads to a future of his own making.

References

External links 
 

Canadian romantic drama films
English-language Canadian films
Films shot in Vancouver
2002 films
2000s English-language films
2000s Canadian films